The 2005 American Le Mans at Mid-Ohio was the third race for the 2005 American Le Mans Series season held at Mid-Ohio sports car course.  It took place on May 22, 2005.

Official results

Class winners in bold.  Cars failing to complete 70% of winner's distance marked as Not Classified (NC).

† - #10 Miracle Motorsports was disqualified for having a driver in the car over the maximum allowable limit.

Statistics
 Pole Position - #15 Zytek Engineering - 1:11.333
 Fastest Lap - #15 Zytek Engineering - 1:12.592
 Distance - 
 Average Speed -

External links
 

M
Sports Car Challenge of Mid-Ohio
American Le Mans at Mid